Luke David Ayling (born 25 August 1991) is an English professional footballer who plays as a defender and often captains  club Leeds United. Although normally playing as a right-back, he can also function as a centre-back.

Ayling began his career at Arsenal joining the club at the age of 8. He was part of Arsenal youth team's double-winning team of the 2008–09 season, before signing his first professional contract in July 2009. Ayling was loaned out to Yeovil Town in March 2010 and played four matches. At the end of the season he agreed a permanent deal with Yeovil. After four seasons with Yeovil, Ayling signed for Bristol City where he played until 2016 when he signed a deal with Leeds United, where he was a mainstay as Leeds won the 2019–20 EFL Championship, under manager Marcelo Bielsa.

Career

Arsenal
Ayling was born in Lambeth, London. He joined Arsenal at the age of 8 despite being a Chelsea fan, progressing through the Arsenal youth teams, playing alongside Jack Wilshere and Kyle Bartley, before signing scholarship forms with the club in the summer of 2007. Ayling featured in the Reserves whilst he was still a schoolboy, and was an integral part of Arsenal youth team's Premier Academy League and FA Youth Cup double-winning team of the 2008–09 season, forming a crucial defensive partnership with Kyle Bartley. In July 2009, Ayling signed his first professional contract with Arsenal.

Ayling's only call into the first-team squad came during the 2009–10 season. Ayling was an unused substitute for a dead rubber 1–0 UEFA Champions League group stage defeat to Greek team Olympiacos on 9 December 2009. Ayling departed the club in June 2010 after his contract expired.

Yeovil Town
In March 2010, Ayling joined League One club Yeovil Town on loan for an initial month, and on 2 April 2010, made his professional debut as a second-half substitute in a 0–0 draw away at Southend United. Ayling's loan was extended until the end of the season, Ayling played four matches in total, including his first league start in the final match of the season against Brighton & Hove Albion, on 8 May 2010.

On 30 June 2010, Ayling agreed a permanent contract with Yeovil. He made his debut in a 2–1 victory over Leyton Orient. Ayling made forty appearances in his first full season with Yeovil but had discipline issues receiving thirteen yellow cards and two red cards. On 19 May 2013, Ayling played in the 2013 League One play-off final at Wembley Stadium as Yeovil beat Brentford 2–1 to earn promotion to the Championship.

After relegation from the Championship during the 2013–14 season with Yeovil Town, his contract expired at the end of the season in June 2014. After rejecting the offer of a new contract at Yeovil, he left the club.

Bristol City
Following his departure from Yeovil Town, Ayling signed for their fellow League club Bristol City on 8 July 2014 for an undisclosed compensation fee, signing a three-year deal. Ayling made his debut for Bristol City, on 9 August 2014, in their opening day victory over Sheffield United.

During the 2014–15 season, Ayling won the Football League Trophy, with Bristol City beating Walsall 2–0 at Wembley Stadium on 22 March 2015. On 18 April 2015, Ayling impressed for Bristol City playing 58 matches that season in all competitions as they were crowned League One champions following a 0–0 draw at home to Coventry City and earned promotion to the Championship. Playing 33 times either playing right-back or centre-back during the 2015–16 season in the Championship, Ayling's form at the back helped Bristol City retain their Championship status.

Leeds United

2016–17
Ayling signed for Championship rivals Leeds United for a fee of £200,000 in August 2016 after former Arsenal team mate Kyle Bartley recommended him to new head coach Garry Monk via a text message. Following an injury to right-back Gaetano Berardi in the opening game against Queens Park Rangers, Monk decided to act and sign him on a three-year deal. The fee would later be considered one of the biggest bargains in the club's recent history, as Ayling would go on to become a seminal figure in the club's resurgence and promotion to the Premier League four years later.

Ayling's maiden season with the club would see the Yorkshire club compete as genuine promotion contenders for the first time in years. Characterised by a solid defence of Ayling, Bartley, Pontus Jansson and Gaetano Berardi, Leeds beat promotion rivals Brighton & Hove Albion 2–0 to move into fourth place with only six games remaining. The club would only win one of those remaining six games as they slid to seventh place and narrowly missed out on the play-offs. However, the campaign would prove to be a turning point for United with attendances up by almost a third, and the completion of Andrea Radrizzani's takeover offering new hope. Ayling, along with fellow team mates from that season Liam Cooper, Stuart Dallas, Kalvin Phillips and Pablo Hernandez would provide much needed stability after years of questionable recruitment.

2017–18
The following 2017–18 season started brightly under new manager Thomas Christiansen with Leeds topping the table after nine games and the right–back signing a new four–year deal with the club in the autumn. They would still be in the play-off positions with Ayling an ever-present by the time they faced Nottingham Forest on New Year's Day. During the 0–0 draw, Ayling would sustain an ankle injury following a tackle by former Leeds teammate Liam Bridcutt ruling him out for the rest of the season. The Whites would only win one of their 17 games as Leeds slipped in the bottom half of the table, before Ayling returned ahead of schedule in the final game of the season against Queens Park Rangers.

2018–19
The summer of 2018 would see the appointment of Marcelo Bielsa as head coach, as Leeds would again compete for promotion back to the Premier League. Ayling would achieve personal milestones during the season, with his first goal for the club coming against Rotherham United and his 100th appearance later being made at home to Swansea City. He would also begin deputising for Liam Cooper as captain. He would make 42 appearances as Leeds slowly lost their grip on automatic promotion, having led the division at Christmas, before losing to Derby County in the play-offs.

2019–20
After being injured towards the very start of 2019–20 pre-season training, Ayling would miss all the pre-season games and the start of the new season after undergoing ankle surgery. On 8 August 2019, it was revealed that Leeds had rejected bids for Ayling during the 2019 transfer window in order to keep him at the club.

He signed a new four-year contract with the club in October 2019. His first goal of the 2019–20 season came on 29 December 2019, in a 5–4 victory in a dramatic win against Birmingham City, with Ayling scoring a long range volley. On 30 December 2019, Ayling was chosen as the right-back for the "Football League Team of the decade" by The Guardian.

On 8 January 2020, after impressive performances during the month of December, Ayling won the EFL Championship PFA Player of the Month award for December 2019, beating former United player Tom Lees as well as Jed Wallace, Lee Tomlin, Sam Johnstone and Andre Ayew. Ayling's goalscoring form continued into February and March, where he scored the solitary goal against Bristol City on 15 February, in a crucial home win that kept Leeds in second place behind West Bromwich Albion, bucking the trend of Leeds' three prior winless results, and his "stunning volley" in Leeds' 2–0 defeat of Huddersfield Town on 7 March that put the team back on top of the Championship. His performances in February saw him awarded the EFL Championship Player of the Month title.

After the English professional football season was paused in March 2020 due to the impact of the COVID-19 pandemic on association football, after the season was resumed during June, Ayling earned promotion to the Premier League with Leeds becoming the EFL Championship Champions for the 2019–20 season in July after the successful resumption of the season.

Ayling won Leeds' goal of the season award for his volley against Huddersfield Town at the club's end of season awards on 24 July 2020. On 7 August, he was named in The Guardian's EFL Championship team of the season for 2019–20.

On 19 August 2020, Ayling won the EFL Championship PFA Fans' Player of the Year for 2019/20 award after beating off competition from nominees including Ollie Watkins and Aleksandar Mitrovic. On 8 September 2020, Ayling was named in Professional Footballers' Association's 2019–20 EFL Championship Team of the Season.

2020–21
Ayling made his 2020–21 Premier League debut in the first match of the season against Liverpool on 12 September 2020, starting and captaining Leeds in the 4–3 defeat at Anfield to the reigning champions, and went on to make a total of 38 league appearances for the season.

2021–22
He scored his first goal for Leeds in the Premier League in the 2021–22 season opener, coming in a 5–1 defeat to rivals Manchester United at Old Trafford. This was nominated as one of the Premier League's Goals of the Month for August. A 17 September knee injury in a 1–1 draw at Newcastle United, a game in which Patrick Bamford also suffered an ankle injury, saw Ayling sidelined for almost three months while he had a minor operation to fix his knee. In his 5 December return game, where he was in the starting lineup, Ayling provided the assist for a 94th-minute equalizer by
Bamford (making his return in the same game) in a 2-2 home draw with Brentford.

On 12 December 2021, Ayling joined a select group of just 70 players that have made over 200 appearances for the club, including current teammates Stuart Dallas, Liam Cooper & Kalvin Phillips. On March 18, 2022, Ayling netted a 90+1 winner against Wolverhampton Wanderers in a thrilling comeback for Leeds United. On May 8, 2022, during a Premier League match against Arsenal, Ayling was sent off for a two footed tackle on Gabriel Martinelli. Ayling was initially shown a yellow card, which was later upgraded to red by VAR.

2022–23
Fitness and injuries limited Ayling’s playing time during the pre-World Cup portion of the season. At the time of the Premier League break on 13 November 2022, he had made only seven league appearances, all bar one as a late substitute. He played the full 90 minutes in just two games in October and November in the league and the League Cup. </ref> On 16 February 2023, the club announced it had extended his contract by a year to the summer of 2024.

Style of play
Ayling plays as a right-back but can also play as a centre-back or as a defensive midfielder. Former Guardian sports writer Steve Claridge lauded Ayling for his "reading of the game, communications skills, organisation skills, aerial prowess, two footedness and use of the ball" in his scouting reports column. Ayling was praised for his defensive work which gave Leeds United a solid start to the 2017–18 season.

Personal life
In August 2019, Ayling was one of the main stars of the Leeds United documentary Take Us Home on Amazon Prime, featuring in several episodes. The documentary was narrated by Academy Award winning actor and Leeds fan Russell Crowe.

Ayling has one daughter, Maisie, who was born in March 2017. On 9 June 2021, he married his wife Poppy, with singer-songwriter Ellie Goulding performing at the ceremony.

Ayling has the nickname "Bill", and is often referred to as such by Leeds players and fans. He speaks with a stammer.

Career statistics

Honours
Arsenal U18
Premier Academy League: 2008–09
FA Youth Cup: 2008–09

Yeovil Town
Football League One play-offs: 2012–13

Bristol City
Football League One: 2014–15
Football League Trophy: 2014–15

Leeds United
Championship: 2019–20

Individual
Championship PFA Fans' Player of the Year: 2019–20
PFA Team of the Year: 2019–20 Championship
Leeds United Goal of the Season: 2019–20
Championship PFA Player of the Month: December 2019 and February 2020.

References

External links

Luke Ayling profile at the Leeds United F.C. website

1991 births
Living people
Footballers from Lambeth
English footballers
Association football defenders
Association football midfielders
Arsenal F.C. players
Yeovil Town F.C. players
Bristol City F.C. players
Leeds United F.C. players
English Football League players
Premier League players